Panorama is a women's World Cup technical ski course on Zauberberg mountain in Semmering, Lower Austria, opened in 1995.

History
On 29 December 1995, they first time hosted World Cup, traditionally between Xmas and New Year's holidays and since 1996/97 exchanging every second year with Lienz, another World Cup host in Austria.

World Cup

Top 3 results

References

External links
FIS Alpine Ski World Cup – Semmering, Austria 

Ski areas in Austria